Afrijet Business Service is a Gabonese airline operating scheduled service to a number of airports throughout Cameroon, Gabon, and São Tomé, as well as the Republic of the Congo.

History
Afrijet was founded in 2004 by a group of private investors, initially flying private charters using Falcon 900 aircraft. In 2016, Afrijet commenced scheduled domestic flights throughout Gabon, and have since expanded to neighboring countries.

On 9 December 2021, AfriJet announced it had partnered with La Compagnie to launch seasonal flights between Paris Orly and Libreville's Léon-Mba International Airport from 16 December 2021

Destinations
As of September 2020, Afrijet serves the following destinations:

Fleet
As of September 2020, the Afrijet fleet consists of the following aircraft:

References

External links

 

Airlines established in 2004
Airlines of Gabon
Companies based in Libreville
2000s establishments in Gabon